The Gray Audograph was a dictation machine format introduced in 1945. It recorded sound by pressing grooves into soft vinyl discs, like the competing, but incompatible, SoundScriber. It was manufactured by the Gray Manufacturing Company of Hartford, Connecticut, in the United States.

The Audograph recorded on thin vinyl discs, recording from the inside to the outside, the opposite of conventional gramophone records. Unlike conventional records, the disc was driven by a surface-mounted wheel. This meant that its recording and playback speed decreased toward the edge of the disc (like the Compact Disc and other digital formats), to keep a more constant linear velocity and to improve playing time.

Along with a Dictabelt sound recorder, an Audograph captured sounds recorded at the time of the John F. Kennedy assassination that were reviewed by the United States House Select Committee on Assassinations.

In 1950, Gray began to make a variant of the Audograph for AT&T, known as the Peatrophone; however, due to what at the time were the high costs of renting and installing the machine, it served only a niche market.

References

External links
Restoring Gray Audograph recordings 
Image of Audograph catalog
The Audograph and the Kennedy assassination

Audiovisual introductions in 1945
Audio storage
1945 in technology
Products introduced in 1945